Events from the year 1987 in art.

Events
10 December – Musée d'art moderne (Saint-Étienne) opens as a separate institution.
22 July – Palestinian cartoonist Naji al-Ali is shot in London; he dies 28 August.

Awards
Archibald Prize – William Robinson, Equestrian self-portrait
John Moores Painting Prize - Tim Head for "Cow mutations"
Turner Prize – Richard Deacon
Shortlisted were: Patrick Caulfield, Helen Chadwick, Richard Long, Declan McGonagle and Thérèse Oulton.

Works

Alice Aycock – Three-Fold Manifestation II (sculpture)
Wayne Chabre – John von Neumann (gargoyle, Eugene, Oregon)
Martin Creed – Work No. 1
Rose Finn-Kelcey – Bureau de Change (installation)
Ulrich Rückriem – Untitled (granite sculpture, Art Institute of Chicago)
Richard Serra – Fulcrum (Cor-Ten steel sculture, Broadgate, City of London)
Andres Serrano – Piss Christ (photograph)
Frank Stella – Decanter (sculpture, Houston, Texas)
Werner Tübke – Early Bourgeois Revolution in Germany
Ernest Zobole – House Interior in Landscape

Births
1 August – CJ de Silva, Filipino art director, painter, graphic designer and illustrator
Xyza Cruz Bacani, Filipina street photographer
Ibrahim Mahama, Ghanaian installation artist

Deaths

January to June
14 February – Else Halling, Norwegian tapestry weaver (b. 1899)
18 February – William Coldstream, English realist painter (b. 1908)
22 February – Andy Warhol, American artist, director and writer (b. 1928)
26 March – Georg Muche, German painter (b. 1895)
19 April – Milt Kahl, American animator (b. 1909)
8 June - Alexander Iolas, Egyptian born Greek gallerist and collector (b. 1908)

July to December
30 July – Michel Tapié, French artist, critic, curator and art collector (b. 1909)
29 August – Naji al-Ali, Palestinian cartoonist (b. c.1938)
September – Alice Rahon, French-born Mexican painter and poet (b. 1904).
25 September – Harry Holtzman, American artist (b. 1912).
4 October – Kalervo Palsa, Finnish artist (b. 1947).
27 October – Jean Hélion, French painter (b. 1904)
28 October – André Masson, French graphic artist (b. 1896)
4 November – Raphael Soyer Russian-born American painter, (b. 1899).
15 November – Ernő Goldfinger, Hungarian-born architect and furniture designer (b. 1902).
2 December – Robert Filliou, French Fluxus artist (b. 1926)
18 December - Dimitrije Bašičević, Serbian painter and sculptor (b. 1921)

Full date unknown
Roland Ansieau, French Art Deco graphic artist (b. 1901).
Huang Yao, Chinese artist (b. 1917)
Raymond Moore, English landscape photographer (b. 1920).
Myron Stout, American abstract painter (b. 1908).

See also 
 1987 in fine arts of the Soviet Union

References

External links

 
 
1980s in art
Years of the 20th century in art